Jerusalem College of Engineering, an engineering college in Chennai, India is an autonomous college that was established in the year 1995. This college is located in the Chennai district. The college is part of the Jerusalem Educational Trust formed and registered in 1993. The motto of the trust is "To Promote Higher Education" in the fields of engineering and technology, medicine, dentistry and paramedical work. It also teaches in the areas of arts, science, commerce and physical education.

Location 
Jerusalem College of Engineering is situated at the Velachery - Tambaram main road, Narayanapuram, Pallikaranai, Velachery, Chennai City.

Courses offered 
The courses offered by Jerusalem College of Engineering are approved by the All India Council for Technical Education (AICTE), New Delhi. and affiliated to Anna University, Chennai.

Undergraduate 
Leading to a B.E/B.Tech degree:

Postgraduate
Leading to an M.E. degree:
 Applied Electronics
Computer Science & Engineering
Power Electronics & Drives
Construction and Management Engineering
Software Engineering
Master of Computer Applications
Master of Business Administration

Accreditation and recognition
 
 Affiliated to Anna University, Chennai.
 Accredited by NBA, New Delhi.
 Accredited with Grade 'A' by NAAC. 
 Awarded as Best Student Branch - 2011-2012 by Computer Society of India, Mumbai.
 2 Student Projects are Recognized by the Media.
 Patents and Copyright has been obtained for 5 Projects.  
 Accredited by Capgemini.
 Department of Electrical Engineering is recognized by Anna University Key Nodal Center.
 Department of Electronics and Communication engineering is recognized by Anna university as a Research Center.
 Certified as a Golden Partner by Keane (formerly known as Caritor India Ltd.).
 The students of the Department of Electronics and Communication Engineering won the Consolation Prize at the TI all India Analog Design Contest for their project in Karoake Machine.

References

External links
Official Website

Engineering colleges in Chennai